WarWizard is a fantasy role-playing video game that was released as shareware in 1993 for the Amiga, then ported to DOS.  It was developed by MicroGenesis, a small company founded by Brad McQuaid and Steve Clover in 1989 who later worked together at Sony Online Entertainment on EverQuest.

Gameplay
The player acts as a "WarWizard", a powerful magic-using character that fights and completes quests.

The combat mode allows targeting specific parts of an opponent's body, hampering movement or disabling the opponents altogether, rendering them unable to flee from the battle or to retaliate. The same thing could also happen to the player, WarWizard, himself.

References

External links
 WarWizard at MobyGames
 WarWizard download link at RPGWatch Forums
 WarWizard download at Abandonia

1993 video games
Amiga games
DOS games
Fantasy video games
Role-playing video games
Video games developed in the United States